Dag Hartelius (born 8 November 1955 in Härnösand) is a Swedish diplomat and the former Director-General of The National Defence Radio Establishment, assuming office 1 November 2013, and leaving office June 2019. In September 2019, he became the Swedish Ambassador to Hungary.

Hartelius has previously been ambassador to Poland 2008–2010, Estonia 2003–2008, stationed in Saint Petersburg, Moscow, Berlin and London, vice president and director for the programme for European security at the EastWest Institute in New York, and a Permanent Representative of Sweden to the European Union.

References

External links
CV for Dag Hartelius, Swedish embassy in Warsaw

1955 births
Living people
People from Härnösand
Uppsala University alumni
Ambassadors of Sweden to Estonia
Ambassadors of Sweden to Poland
Recipients of the Order of the Cross of Terra Mariana, 1st Class